Karambar Lake, also known as Qurumbar Lake, is a high altitude lake located in Broghil Valley , District Upper Chitral, Khyber Pakhtunkhwa,Pakistan. It is the 33rd highest lake in the world and falls in the Hindu Kush-Himalaya region, which is one of the world's richest biodiversity regions.

Alternate names
The lake is also known as Qurumbar Lake in some references and alternately is spelled as Karomber or Karamber.

Hydrology

Water clarity level is 13.75 (Secchi Disc Reading), which is the highest value ever recorded in the literature of lakes in Pakistan.

See also 
List of lakes of Pakistan

References

Lakes of Gilgit-Baltistan